The  opened in Izumo, Shimane Prefecture, Japan in 2007.

The design, by architect Fumihiko Maki, references the locally-important tatara steel; construction was completed in March 2006.

The permanent collection focuses on Izumo-taisha, Izumo Fudoki, and bronze artifacts of the Kofun period - including National Treasures from the Kojindani site - as well as the history of life in Shimane.

See also
 Izumo-taisha
 List of National Treasures of Japan (archaeological materials)

References

External links
   Shimane Museum of Ancient Izumo
   Shimane Museum of Ancient Izumo
 Shimane Museum of Ancient Izumo at Google Cultural Institute

History museums in Japan
Prefectural museums
Museums in Shimane Prefecture
Museums established in 2007
2007 establishments in Japan